"Le Disko" is the first single by rock group Shiny Toy Guns from their album We Are Pilots. In the United States, it peaked at No. 26 on the Modern Rock Tracks chart and No. 14 on the Billboard Bubbling Under Hot 100 Singles chart. It reached No. 42 on the Hot Canadian Digital Singles chart.

Official versions
Version 1
Version 2
Radio Edit
Tommie Sunshine Demo Mix
Tommie Sunshine Remix
Tommie Sunshine Brooklyn Fire and Brimstone Remix
Dirt Empire Mix
Mark Saunders Mix
Ferry Corsten Remix
Boys Noize Vocal Mix
Boys Noize Fire Dub
Disco D Dirty Mix
La Dolce Vita Remix

Music video 
There are three music videos for "Le Disko":

 The first involves the band performing in a desert-like area while soldiers run around and mimic children, showing that they are "little boys" with "little toys." It uses the version of "Le Disko" found on We Are Pilots version 1.
 The second is filmed on a green screen. It involves Carah dancing and romancing the men of the band, only to strangle them to death. It uses the version of "Le Disko" found on We Are Pilots version 1.
 The third, focused on the band playing in a club, is the official version. The primary character of focus is of a young man. He is seduced by a woman that dances with him after breaking from dancing with another woman. Eventually most of the women turn into Kafkaesque monsters and murder the men. It uses the version of "Le Disko" found on We Are Pilots.

Charts

Usage in other media
"Le Disko" was featured in the 2010 Sundance film, "Welcome to the Rileys".
"Le Disko" was featured on an episode of The Real World: Sydney.
It was featured on the British programme Waterloo Road.
Also featured in the soundtrack of the video game Burnout Dominator.
It appeared on an episode of So You Think You Can Dance in Lacey Schwimmer's solo.
Also appeared in episode 2 season 4 "Livin La Vida Loca" of The L Word.
It appeared as well in episode "Things I Forgot at Birth" of One Tree Hill.
The song was also featured and on the soundtrack for the snowboard film People by MDP.
It is also included in Logic Pro 8 as an entire session file.
"Le Disko" was also used as lead song on an America's Next Top Model cycle 8 commercial.
The song was used in a commercial for the new season of Dancing with the Stars.
Used also in an advertisement for the Asia Extreme series on the Sundance Channel.
In Australia, it was used in a commercial for the Honda CR-V.
A commercial for the Motorola RAZR2 also featured the single.
The song was used in a trailer for the 2009 film Sorority Row.
"Le Disko" is also heavily sampled on the song "& Down" by German electronic producer Boys Noize.
"Le Disko (Boys Noize Vocal Mix)" was used in the film Project X.
"Le Disko" is one of 30 songs which can be played while riding Hollywood Rip Ride Rockit in Universal Studios Florida
"Le Disko" was one of the songs featured in ABC Family's Beyond The Shadows: The Making Of Shadowhunters

2007 debut singles
Shiny Toy Guns songs
2007 songs
Songs written by Jeremy Dawson
Universal Motown Records singles
Electroclash songs
Electronic rock songs